Calypso is a collection of 21 semi-autobiographical essays by David Sedaris. It was published on May 29, 2018 by Little, Brown and Company. 14 of the 21 essays were previously published in a magazine or newspaper; some of these were published under a different title or in a different form.

Essays

Synopsis 
In Calypso, Sedaris writes primarily about his family and aging, as he is approaching the age his mother was when she died of cancer (62) and his sister Tiffany had recently died by suicide. He purchases a seaside vacation home in Emerald Isle, North Carolina for the remaining siblings to spend time in with their father, now in his 90s, as they did growing up. He also discusses shopping for clothes in Japan with his sisters and a gastrointestinal virus he acquires while on book tour, an experience he views in terms of looming incontinence of old age.

Reception
The review aggregator website Book Marks reported that 65% of critics gave the book a "rave" review, whilst 30% of the critics expressed "positive" impressions, based on a sample of 23 reviews.

References

2018 non-fiction books
American essay collections
Little, Brown and Company books
Works by David Sedaris